Deputatskaya Street is a street in Zheleznodorozhny and Tsentralny districts of Novosibirsk, Russia. It consists of two fragments. The first fragment crosses Street of Revolution and forms a T-intersection with Uritsky Street. The second fragment starts from a T-shaped intersection with Krasny Avenue, crosses Kamenskaya Street and forms a T-intersection with Shamshin Family Street.

Structures
 Istomin House is a two-story building built in 1905.
 Prombank is a building built in 1927. The building was later reconstructed. It is occupied by Novosibirsk City Hall.
 Red Torch Theatre is a drama theatre, directed by Timofey Kulyabin since 2015. 
 Novosibirsk Opera and Ballet Theatre is the largest theatre in Russia. It was built in 1944.

Companies 
The head office of the Siberian Grain Corporation is located on the street.

Gallery

Transport

Metro
Entrances to Ploshchad Lenina Station are located on the street.

Notables
 Matvey Batrakov (1900–1995) was a Major General, military commissar of the Novosibirsk Oblast, Hero of the Soviet Union. He lived in number 26 from 1966 to 1995.
 Anatoly Ivanov (1928–1999) was a Soviet and Russian writer. He lived in house 38 from 1957 to 1969.
 Anatoly Nikulkov (1922–2001) was a Soviet and Russian writer. He lived in house 38 from 1958 to 2001.
 Anna Pokidchenko (1926–2014) was a Soviet and Russian theater actress. People's Artist of the USSR. She lived in house 38.

References

Tsentralny City District, Novosibirsk
Zheleznodorozhny City District, Novosibirsk
Streets in Novosibirsk